Longerakvatnet or Longeraksvatnet is a lake in the municipality of Bygland in Agder county, Norway. It has a small dam on the southwest side to regulate the water level for hydro-electric power generation at a plant located down the hill. The lake discharges into the Longeraksåni river which flows into the Byglandsfjorden near the village of Longerak.

See also
List of lakes in Aust-Agder
List of lakes in Norway

References

Lakes of Agder
Setesdal
Bygland
Reservoirs in Norway